Monica Mesalles (born ) was a Spanish female artistic gymnast, representing her nation at international competitions.  

She participated at the 2004 Summer Olympics. 
She also competed at world championships, including the 2003 World Artistic Gymnastics Championships in Anaheim.

References

External links

1987 births
Living people
Spanish female artistic gymnasts
Place of birth missing (living people)
Gymnasts at the 2004 Summer Olympics
Olympic gymnasts of Spain